Marcelo Fernando Guerrero (born 20 January 1983 in Montevideo) is a Uruguayan football forward.

Career
Guerrero began his playing career in 2002 with Villa Española in 2003 he joined Nacional. Guerrero had his first experience of Argentine football in 2004 when he joined Racing Club de Avellaneda, after 7 goals in 24 games with Racing he joined Mexican side Real San Luis where he played until 2008. In 2009, he returned to Argentina to sign for Colón de Santa Fe but returned to Uruguay after making only 4 league appearances for the Santa Fe club.

External links
 
 Statistics at BDFA 
 

1983 births
Living people
Uruguayan people of Spanish descent
Uruguayan people of Basque descent
Footballers from Montevideo
Uruguayan footballers
Uruguayan expatriate footballers
Association football forwards
Club Nacional de Football players
Racing Club de Avellaneda footballers
Club Atlético Colón footballers
San Luis F.C. players
Defensor Sporting players
Defensa y Justicia footballers
Unión Temuco footballers
Comunicaciones F.C. players
Central Español players
Uruguayan Primera División players
Liga MX players
Primera B de Chile players
Argentine Primera División players
Uruguayan expatriate sportspeople in Chile
Uruguayan expatriate sportspeople in Argentina
Uruguayan expatriate sportspeople in Mexico
Uruguayan expatriate sportspeople in Guatemala
Expatriate footballers in Chile
Expatriate footballers in Argentina
Expatriate footballers in Mexico
Expatriate footballers in Guatemala